In predicate logic, universal instantiation (UI; also called universal specification or universal elimination, and sometimes confused with dictum de omni) is a valid rule of inference from a truth about each member of a class of individuals to the truth about a particular individual of that class. It is generally given as a quantification rule for the universal quantifier but it can also be encoded in an axiom schema. It is one of the basic principles used in quantification theory.

Example: "All dogs are mammals. Fido is a dog. Therefore Fido is a mammal."

Formally, the rule as an axiom schema is given as
 
for every formula A and every term a, where  is the result of substituting a for each free occurrence of x in A.  is an instance of 

And as a rule of inference it is
from  infer 

Irving Copi noted that universal instantiation "...follows from variants of rules for 'natural deduction', which were devised independently  by Gerhard Gentzen and Stanisław Jaśkowski in 1934."

Quine 
According to Willard Van Orman Quine, universal instantiation and existential generalization are two aspects of a single principle, for instead of saying that "∀x x = x" implies "Socrates = Socrates", we could as well say that the denial "Socrates ≠ Socrates" implies "∃x x ≠ x". The principle embodied in these two operations is the link between quantifications and the singular statements that are related to them as instances. Yet it is a principle only by courtesy. It holds only in the case where a term names and, furthermore, occurs referentially.

See also
Existential instantiation 
Existential generalization
Existential quantification
Inference rules

References

Rules of inference
Predicate logic